The Robert Rensselaer Bartlett House is a historic residence located in Astoria, Oregon, United States.

The house was listed on the National Register of Historic Places in 1986.

See also
National Register of Historic Places listings in Clatsop County, Oregon

References

External links

1921 establishments in Oregon
Bungalow architecture in Oregon
Colonial Revival architecture in Oregon
Individually listed contributing properties to historic districts on the National Register in Oregon
Houses completed in 1921
Houses on the National Register of Historic Places in Astoria, Oregon